Seyneb Nesha Saleh (born 25 December 1987) is a German actress. She is best known for her role as Naadirah in the 2018 Netflix film Mute.

Biography 
Seyneb Nesha Saleh was born on 25 December 1987 in Aalen, Baden-Württemberg. She is a daughter of a German mother and an Iraqi father. Apart from two years in Casablanca, where she attended an American school, she was mainly raised in Germany. Saleh lives in Berlin.

She studied acting from 2008 to 2012 at the Berlin University of the Arts and received a scholarship from the German Academic Scholarship Foundation Studienstiftung des deutschen Volkes in 2010.

Career 

2015 she transitioned to the Volkstheater Vienna, where she was a member of the acting ensemble and appeared until 2018. During this period she worked with acclaimed theater directors such as Yael Renan, Dušan David Pařízek and Stephan Kimmig. She also repeatedly worked with the puppeteer and director Nikolaus Habjan, who has taught her puppeteering. In his shows she hence performed as an actress as well as a puppeteer.

In 2016 Saleh landed her first English-language role in Duncan Jones' Mute. In the neo-noir science fiction film she played the mysterious girlfriend Naadirah of a mute bartender played by Alexander Skarsgård. The Netflix production got released in February 2018.

2018 She further appeared in Deutschland 86 in an Arabic-speaking role and in the German Netflix production Dogs of Berlin.
2022 in the Sky series she takes the role of a German officer in “Munich Games” trying to foil a potential terrorist attack on the 50th anniversary of the 1972 Olympic massacre of Israeli athletes and coaches.Her situation is complicated by her affair with her Arabic speaking informant.

Filmography

Film

Theater

Television

References

External links
 
German Agency
Independent Talent

Living people
Actors from Baden-Württemberg
German actresses
1987 births
People from Aalen